Anton "Toni" Eichholzer (born 5 August 1903, date of death unknown) was an Austrian boxer who competed in the 1924 Summer Olympics. In 1924 he was eliminated in the first round of the lightweight class after losing his fight to Haakon Hansen.

References

External links
profile

1903 births
Year of death missing
Lightweight boxers
Olympic boxers of Austria
Boxers at the 1924 Summer Olympics
Austrian male boxers